Siwara is a village in the Bawani Khera tehsil of the Bhiwani district in the Indian state of Haryana. , the village had 760 households with a population of 4,176 of which 2,211 were male and 1,965 female.

References

Villages in Bhiwani district